= Yashma Tretiy =

- Location within Azerbaijan
- Coordinates: 40°39′52″N 49°31′32″E
- Country: Azerbaijan
- Rayon: Sumqayit
- Time zone: UTC+4 (AZT)
  - Summer (DST): UTC+5 (AZT)

Yashma Tretiy is a village in Sumqayit, Azerbaijan.
